Savannah Union Station was a train station in Savannah, Georgia.  It was located at 419 through 435 West Broad Street, between Stewart and Roberts streets, on the site that is now listed as 435 Martin Luther King Jr. Boulevard. It hosted the Atlantic Coast Line Railroad, the Seaboard Air Line Railroad and the Southern Railway. While the term, union station, in the United States generally implies a station that hosts all train companies stopping in a city, the Central of Georgia and the Savannah and Atlanta Railway used other stations in Savannah.

Architecture

It was designed by Columbia, South Carolina architect Frank Pierce Milburn and completed in 1902 at a cost of $150,000.  It was an example of Spanish Renaissance and Elizabethian styles.  The main feature of the structure was an octagonal rotunda which measured 80 feet in diameter and served as the general waiting room.  Since most of the station's history took place under the South's Jim Crow segregation system, a colored waiting room was assigned to African-Americans.

The exterior walls were made of pressed brick with granite and terra cotta trimmings.  The building also had two towers.

Significance and history
Many visitors disembarked trains onto West Broad Street.  They brought enough business for theaters, bars, stores to open in that section of town.  For decades, the Union Station and its surroundings became known as the economic and cultural center for Black Savannah.

In August 1962 the remaining passenger trains were shifted to the new Atlantic Coast Line station on the periphery of Savannah, which remains in use today by Amtrak. A year later, Union Station was demolished to make room for Interstate 16 and what would eventually be known as the Earl T. Shinhoster Interchange.

Named trains
Several named trains made stops at the station:

Current use of the site
An Enmark service station (405 Martin Luther King, Jr. Blvd) is located nearby what was once the site of the Union Station.

The Savannah Visitor Information Center is in the former Central of Georgia Depot and Trainshed, located nearby, at 301 Martin Luther King, Jr. Blvd.

See also
 Central of Georgia Depot and Trainshed (Savannah, Georgia), station for CG trains to Atlanta
 Savannah station (Amtrak), the current train station for Savannah

References

Former railway stations in Georgia (U.S. state)
Railway stations in the United States opened in 1902
Demolished railway stations in the United States
Union Station
Railway stations closed in 1962
Union stations in the United States
Frank Pierce Milburn buildings
Former Atlantic Coast Line Railroad stations
Former Southern Railway (U.S.) stations
Former Seaboard Air Line Railroad stations
1902 establishments in Georgia (U.S. state)
Seaboard Air Line Railroad stations